Chada Venkat Reddy (born 30 June 1950) is an Indian politician and leader of Communist Party of India (CPI). He was elected as a member of Andhra Pradesh Legislative Assembly from Indurthi in 2004. He elected as First state secretary of CPI Telangana State Council in May 2014.

References

Communist Party of India politicians from Telangana
Living people
1950 births
Andhra Pradesh MLAs 2004–2009